GPM may refer to:

GPM (software), software providing support for mouse devices in Linux virtual consoles
Graphical path method, a mathematically based algorithm used in project management
Gallons per minute, a unit of volumetric flow rate
Gallons per mile, a unit of fuel efficiency
Gaurela-Pendra-Marwahi district, Chhattisgarh, India
General Purpose Macrogenerator, an early macro processor
Global Marshall Plan, specific ideas on how to save the global environment
Global Precipitation Measurement, a NASA and Japan Aerospace Exploration Agency project to measure global rainfall
Graduated payment mortgage, a type of loan
Graham Patrick Martin, an American actor
Grand Prairie Municipal Airport, a public-use airfield in Grand Prairie, Texas, United States (Federal Aviation Administration identification code)
Grand Prix Masters, an auto racing series for retired Formula One drivers
Gross profit margin, a calculation of revenue and cost of products
Protestant Church in the Moluccas, a church denomination in the Indonesian provinces of Maluku and North Maluku, which in Indonesian is referred to as "Gereja Protestan Maluku"
Google Play Music, a cloud media player by Google